Arkady Alexandrovich Plastov (– 12 May 1972) was a Russian socialist realist painter.

Biography

Plastov was born into a family of icon painters in the village Prislonikha in the Russian Governorate of Simbirsk. He attended the sculpture department of the Moscow School of Painting, Sculpture and Architecture beginning in 1914. In 1917, he returned to his native village, where he occupied himself with painting, drawing from nature.

Starting in 1935, he steps introduces his category painting into the public. According to the strict political-artistic doctrine of the time at that time, which only permits the style of socialist realism in all art kinds, Plastov pictures the life in the Soviet Union, the pervasive building up of socialism. His work is characterized by his knowledge of the life in the villages of the Soviet Union, his love for his native land, strong, live pictures and his skills of painting. As the reaction to the events, which moved the population of the Soviet Union at that time, Plastov showed in his pictures, how the village life had changed  by the collectivization. As models of the Protagonists of his works Plastov chose characters of his homeland village. The outbreak of World War II inspired new motives for the work of Plastov. He depictured suffering of the Soviet people, work of the women, old people and children on the kolkhoz fields during the war. After the war Plastov kept the motives of the village life.

A characteristic for Plastov's works is the 1951 painting Spring (Весна). It shows a young naked woman dressing up a girl in front of a wood hut (a Banya, the Russian counterpart to the Finnish sauna). It snows, and in the background there are snow-covered pastures. Spring is considered as a turning point in the Soviet history of art. For the first time since the introduction of socialist realism a work of art showed an unpolitical everyday life scene in Soviet Union, without bringing any political message, as could be found in Plastov's earlier works that glorified the collectivization.

During his artistic career Plastov was awarded two Orders of Lenin, he was laureate of the Stalin Prize, (1946), Lenin prize (1966) and he also (in 1972, posthumously) was nominated for the State Prize of the RSFSR named Ilya Repin – for his painting "Balefire in a Field", "Out of the Past" and a series of portraits of his contemporaries.

Museum Collections 

 Plastov's page on the State Tretyakov Gallery portal. 
 Smolensk State Museum-Reserve (Plastov' Guest from the Front Line 1944) 
 Plastov Solo Exhibition, 2013. State Russian Museum, St Petersburg  
 Tver Regional Art Gallery  
  Perm State Art Gallery 
 Ekaterinburg Fine Art Museum 
 Chelyabinsk State Fine Art Museum 
 State Art Museum of Nizhny Novgorod  
 Samara Art Museum  
 Ulyanovsk Regional Art Museum  
 Volgograd Fine Art Museum искусств 
 Saratov State Art Museum  
 Astrakhan State Art Gallery  
 Rostov-on-Don Regional Fine Art Museum  
 Kursk State Art Gallery  
 Tula Regional Art Museum  
 State Art Museum of Altai Krai, Barnaul  (Plastov'  Portrait of the Artist Kiselyov  1961) 
  Primorye State Art Gallery (Plastov' Letter 1971; p. 3)
 Primorye State Fine Art Gallery, Vladivostok   
 Irkutsk Art Museum   (Plastov' Tractor Drivers' Supper 1951, up stairs, to the right).

Video Links
 Film by A. Ignashov, with Plastov's lifetime shooting, on Russian, 35 min. 
 Arkady Plastov and realistic Russian painting after World War II, on Russian 17 min.
 Film depicted the celebration of 120-year Anniversary of A. Plastov and Jubilee Exhibition, Moscow, 2013 on Russian, 59 min.

External links
 Two color illustrations for the Leo Tolstoy novel Cossacks, 1952–1953, tempera. Leo Tolstoy Museum Государственный музей Л.Н. Толстого
 One of the potrtait paintings of Arkady Plastov an Lindsay Fine Art Auction
 Музей современного изобразительного искусства имени А. А. Пластова Fine Art Museum of Ulyanovsk named after A. Plastov.
 Plastov Museum in the city of Ulyanovsk.
 Музей-усадьба народного художника СССР А. Пластова, Ульяновская область, Карсунский район, село Прислониха ( Prislonikha Art Museum in the native village of A. Plastov —near Ulyanovsk (former Simbirsk), Volga region).
 2013: The Artistic Award named after Plastov was established of Ulyanovsk Region administration, native place of Arkady Plastov. «Russia Today» news from January 2013, Video
 Page on  letter P from the Encyclopaedia Dictionary of 1953 with the article «Plastov»
 Biography and more than 20 painting-links at «Soyuz Gallery» page.
 Some notes on Arkady Plastov life. РИА Новости (on Russian).
 Plastov page on a RusArtist portal; biography, some paintings.
 Arkady  Plastov at Springville Museum of Art. Springville, Utah, USA.

References

Bibliography

 Brown, Matthew Cullerne; Taylor, Brandon (1993). Art of the Soviets: painting, sculpture, and architecture in a one-party state, 1917–1992. Manchester University Press ND. . pp. vi, 75, 77, 83, 84, 131, 137, 184, 226.
 Christ, Thomas: Der Sozialistische Realismus. Betrachtungen zum Sozialistischen Realismus in der Sowjetzeit. Basel: Wiese Verlag 1999. 
 Сказка про мальчика, понимавшего язык земли : Аркадий Пластов / Е. В. Мурашова. — Москва : Белый город, 2001. — 10 с. : ил. — (Сказки о художниках). —  (children's book, on Russian)
 Борисовская, Н. А./ Гордон, Е. С. (Hrsg.): Русские художники от А до Я. Москва: Слово 2000. . S. 138 (on Russian).

1893 births
1972 deaths
Soviet realist painters
20th-century Russian painters
Russian male painters
Russian realist painters
Socialist realist artists
Russian watercolorists
Full Members of the USSR Academy of Arts
Stalin Prize winners
Recipients of the Order of Lenin
Lenin Prize winners
People's Artists of the USSR (visual arts)
People from Ulyanovsk Oblast
Soviet Impressionist painters
Moscow School of Painting, Sculpture and Architecture alumni